Mahalleh Kola (also Romanized as Maḩalleh Kolā) is a village in Siyahrud Rural District, in the Central District of Juybar County, Mazandaran Province, Iran. At the 2006 census, its population was 451, in 126 families.

References 

Populated places in Juybar County